Varnell Creek is a  long 3rd order tributary to the Rocky River in Chatham County, North Carolina.

Course
Varnell Creek rises about 5 miles northeast of Siler City, North Carolina in Chatham County and then follows a southerly course to join the Rocky River about 2 miles east of Siler City.

Watershed
Varnell Creek drains  of area, receives about 47.8 in/year of precipitation, has a wetness index of 443.32 and is about 44% forested.

References

Rivers of North Carolina
Rivers of Chatham County, North Carolina